Ráztoka is a village and municipality in Brezno District, in the Banská Bystrica Region of central Slovakia.
In the village is public library, football pitch, public swimming pool as well as cable TV network.

References

External links
http://www.e-obce.sk/obec/raztoka/raztoka.html

Villages and municipalities in Brezno District